Mucosal lentigines is a cutaneous condition characterized by light brown macules on mucosal surfaces.

See also 
 Lentigo
 Skin lesion

References 

Melanocytic nevi and neoplasms